23P/Brorsen–Metcalf is a periodic comet with an orbital period of 70 years. It fits the classical definition of a Halley-type comet with (20 years < period < 200 years). It was first discovered by Theodor Brorsen at the Altona Observatory on July 20, 1847, and again by Kaspar Schweizer (Moscow) on August 11, 1847. It was predicted that it would reappear between 1919 and 1922.

On August 21, 1919, the comet was recovered by Joel Hastings Metcalf (Camp Idlewild, Vermont, United States) as 8th magnitude. Additional discoveries were made by Edward Barnard (Yerkes Observatory, Wisconsin, United States) on August 22, Michel Giacobini (Paris, France), Ostrovlev (Theodosia, Crimea) and Selavanov (Saint Petersburg). By the end of September 1919 it was confirmed as being the same as Brorsen's comet. 

The comet became visible with naked eye as a small hazy spot of light and on 6 October 1919 it was estimated to have a magnitude of 4.5. The comet had a slender tail with a length of 8,5 degrees. On the photographs of the comet on 22 October 1919 a disconnection event of the tail was visible, that probably started on 20 October.

The comet was recovered by the Palomar Observatory on 4 July 1989, when it had an estimated magnitude of 15, while Alan Hale estimated visually that it had a magnitude of 11.5 on 7 July. The comet brightned rapidly during July and by the end of the month it was reported to have an apparent magnitude of 7-7.5, while developped a short tail. The comet reached its perigee on 6 August, at a distance of 0.62 AU, while its perihelion was on 11 September. Between the two dates the comet had a magnitude between 5 and 6 and was reported to be visible by naked eye. In September the tail grew longer and was reported visually to have a length of about 7 degrees. The comet faded in the second half of September and the diminishing solar elongation hindered further observations. During the 1989 apparition, the comet became the first comet to be definitely detected in submillimeter wavelengths.

References

External links
 Orbital simulation from JPL (Java) / Horizons Ephemeris
 23P at Kronk's Cometography
 23P at Kazuo Kinoshita's Comets
 23P at Seiichi Yoshida's Comet Catalog

Periodic comets
Halley-type comets
0023
023P
023P
18470720